
This is a list of aircraft in alphabetical order beginning with 'S'.

Sr

S.R.A.P.
(Société pour la Réalisation d'Avions Prototypes)
 S.R.A.P. 2

SRAP
(Société pour la Réalisation d'Appareils)
 SRAP 2
 SRAP T-7
 SRAP Spifire IX-c
 SRAP Spitfire IX-e

SRCM
(Société de Recherches et de Constructions Mécaniques)
 SRCM Joigny  (SRCM 153 Joigny)

References

Further reading

External links

 List Of Aircraft (S)

de:Liste von Flugzeugtypen/N–S
fr:Liste des aéronefs (N-S)
nl:Lijst van vliegtuigtypes (N-S)
pt:Anexo:Lista de aviões (N-S)
ru:Список самолётов (N-S)
sv:Lista över flygplan/N-S
vi:Danh sách máy bay (N-S)